June 26 - Eastern Orthodox Church calendar - June 28

All fixed commemorations below celebrated on July 10 by Orthodox Churches on the Old Calendar.

For June 27th, Orthodox Churches on the Old Calendar commemorate the saints listed on June 14.

Saints
 Saint Joanna the Myrrhbearer (1st century)
 Martyr Anectus of Caesarea Palaestina (298 or 304)
 Martyrs Therapon, Macarius, Marcius and Marcia.
 Hieromartyrs Crescens, Maximus, and Theonest, Bishops of Mainz, Germany (early 5th century)
 Venerable Sampson the Hospitable of Constantinople (530)
 Saint Severus of Interocrea in Italy (Severus d’Antrodoco), presbyter (6th century)
 Hieromartyr Pierius of Antioch, presbyter, by fire.
 Venerable Luke the Hermit.

Pre-Schism Western saints
 Saint Clement, a martyr in Córdoba in Spain under Diocletian (He belongs to the group led by St Zoilus) (c. 298)
 Saint Zoilus and Companions, a youth martyred in Córdoba in Spain under Diocletian (c. 301)
 Saint Deodatus of Nola, Deacon of St Paulinus of Nola in Italy and later his successor (473)
 Saint John of Chinon, born in Brittany, he became a hermit in Chinon in the west of France, where he became the spiritual father of Queen Radegund (6th century)

Post-Schism Orthodox saints
 Saint George of the Holy Mountain and Georgia (1065)
 Blessed Martin of Turov (after 1146)
 Martyrdom of Monk Luke (Mukhaidze) of Holy Cross Monastery in Jerusalem (1277)
 New Martyr Iakovos, of Emesa in Syria and of Tripoli in Lebanon, ascetic (15th or 16th century)
 Venerable Serapion of Kozhaezersk Monastery (1611)
 Hieromartyr Cyril Loukaris, Ecumenical Patriarch of Constantinople (1638)

New martyrs and confessors
 New Hieromartyr Gregory Nikolsky, priest, of Kuban (1918)
 New Hieromartyr Alexander Sidorov, priest (1918)
 New Hieromartyr Vladimir Sergeev, priest (1918)
 New Hieromartyr Kirion II, Catholicos-Patriarch of All Georgia (1918)
 New Hieromartyr Peter Ostroumov, priest (1939)

Other commemorations
 The narrative of Synesius of Cyrene, Philosopher and Bishop of Cyrene, about Evagrius the Philosopher and the 300 pieces of gold (c. 411)
 Uncovering of the relics of Optina Elders (1998): 
 Leonid, Macarius, Hilarion, Ambrose, Anatole I, Barsanuphius, and Anatole II.

Icon gallery

Notes

References

Sources
 June 27/July 10. Orthodox Calendar (PRAVOSLAVIE.RU).
 July 10 / June 27. HOLY TRINITY RUSSIAN ORTHODOX CHURCH (A parish of the Patriarchate of Moscow).
 June 27. OCA - The Lives of the Saints.
 The Autonomous Orthodox Metropolia of Western Europe and the Americas (ROCOR). St. Hilarion Calendar of Saints for the year of our Lord 2004. St. Hilarion Press (Austin, TX). p. 47.
 The Twenty-Seventh Day of the Month of June. Orthodoxy in China.
 June 27. Latin Saints of the Orthodox Patriarchate of Rome.
 The Roman Martyrology. Transl. by the Archbishop of Baltimore. Last Edition, According to the Copy Printed at Rome in 1914. Revised Edition, with the Imprimatur of His Eminence Cardinal Gibbons. Baltimore: John Murphy Company, 1916. p. 187.
 Rev. Richard Stanton. A Menology of England and Wales, or, Brief Memorials of the Ancient British and English Saints Arranged According to the Calendar, Together with the Martyrs of the 16th and 17th Centuries. London: Burns & Oates, 1892. pp. 291–292.
Greek Sources
 Great Synaxaristes:  27 ΙΟΥΝΙΟΥ. ΜΕΓΑΣ ΣΥΝΑΞΑΡΙΣΤΗΣ.
  Συναξαριστής. 27 Ιουνίου. ECCLESIA.GR. (H ΕΚΚΛΗΣΙΑ ΤΗΣ ΕΛΛΑΔΟΣ). 
  27 Ιουνίου. Αποστολική Διακονία της Εκκλησίας της Ελλάδος (Apostoliki Diakonia of the Church of Greece).
  27/06/2018. Ορθόδοξος Συναξαριστής. 
Russian Sources
  10 июля (27 июня). Православная Энциклопедия под редакцией Патриарха Московского и всея Руси Кирилла (электронная версия). (Orthodox Encyclopedia - Pravenc.ru).
  27 июня по старому стилю / 10 июля по новому стилю. Русская Православная Церковь - Православный церковный календарь на 2017 год.
  27 июня (ст.ст.) 10 июля 2014 (нов. ст.). Русская Православная Церковь Отдел внешних церковных связей. (DECR).

June in the Eastern Orthodox calendar